The 1936 West Virginia gubernatorial election took place on November 3, 1936, to elect the governor of West Virginia. Chapman Revercomb unsuccessfully ran for the Republican nomination.

Results

References

1936
gubernatorial
West Virginia
November 1936 events